Kanine Records is an independent record label based in the Williamsburg section of Brooklyn, New York started at the end of 2002 by Lio and Kay Kanine. Their first release, NY: The Next Wave, was a 20 track compilation featuring mostly unsigned and emerging acts from the area. From there, they started to sign local bands and release CD EPs, 12-inch vinyl and eventually full-length records.  The label remains independent and continues to grow due to the ongoing success of artists like Grizzly Bear, Chairlift, and Surfer Blood. Recent and upcoming releases include albums by The Natvral (Kip Berman from The Pains Of Being Pure At Heart), Pearl Charles, Hoorsees, Lucid Express, and VEPS.

Roster

Current artists 
Agent blå
Blushing
Braids
Chairlift
Diary
Eternal Summers
Fear of Men
Garden Centre
Grizzly Bear
Hockey Dad
Honey Cutt
Honey Lung
Hoorsees
Las Robertas
Living Hour
Lucid Express
Nicole Yun
Pearl Charles
Pinact
Splashh
Skywave
Surfer Blood
Tallies
The Blow
The Depreciation Guild
The Natvral
Veps
Weaves
Weeping Icon
Young Prisms

Former artists 
Blind Man's Colour
Beach Day (band)
Beverly (band)
Bleeding Rainbow
Dinowalrus
Dream Diary
Drink Up Buttercup
 Expert Alterations
Flowers
Four Volts
Grooms
Holy Hail
The iOs
The Izzys
Jean on Jean
Leave The Planet
Mixel Pixel
Mommy and Daddy
Northern State
Oxford Collapse
Pepper Rabbit
Princeton
Professor Murder
Rockethouse
September Girls
Shock Cinema
The Flesh
Valleys
Viernes
ZAZA

See also
 List of record labels

External links
 
Bandcamp
Facebook
Instagram
 Twitter
YouTube
 

American independent record labels
Record labels established in 2002
Alternative rock record labels
2002 establishments in New York City